Walking After U is a South Korean female rock quartet based in Seoul, South Korea, that was formed in 2014 as a merger of Rubber Duckie and Swingz.

Members

Current 
 Baek Haein  백해인  (lead vocals, guitar)
 Kim Seonghee "Sunny"  김성희  (keyboard, backup vocals)
 Seo Ahyeon "A-zzang"  서아현  (drums, backup vocals)
 Jo Hangyum 조한겸 (bass)

Former member 
 Bae Mihye  "Baemi"  배미헤 (bass, backup vocals)
 Song Jia   송지아  (guitar, backup vocals)
 Cho Minyeong  조민영  (bass, backup vocals)

History

Background 
The band is a merger originating from a collaboration at the Girls' Rock Festival Season 6 between Rubber Duckie and Swingz. Rubber Duckie was led by technical guitarist Jia starting in the early 2000s, along with (then) drummer Sunny. Rubber Duckie had attained much recognition as a strong female rock group, and had released two singles and a full album. Swings was led by vocal and bassist Haein, along with drummer A-zzang. Swings received much critical acclaim and mainstream popularity when proceeding through several elimination rounds on 'Top Band - Season 2'. Both Rubber Duckie and Swings were featured in episode "Breaking Down Our Prejudice" of Arirang TV's program "Rock on Korea" in July 2013.

After the Girls' Rock Festival, and much discussion by management of both bands, an agreement was reached to draw talent and form a single new band. Walking After U drew from both bands' previous work, taking strengths and finding a new style. Many songs in the current repertoire still come from one of the previous bands' catalogs.

Touring 
After releasing their debut album, WAU toured South Korea extensively. Playing in clubs, bars, coffee shops, and concert venues, the band focused on building a wide fanbase. Following their Korean tour, they briefly toured Japan and Taiwan as well.
WAU is maintaining a focus on live shows and building their fan base. Kicking off their second East Asia tour in December 2014, they will promote album Unleash... in Japan, Taiwan, China, and beyond.

Discography

Albums 
 Unleash... , September 20, 2014
 Running Wild, 2016
 Arirang, 2017
 Six of Swords, 2020
 Are We Ready?, 2021
 Annyeong, 2022
 Different Color #blue, 2022

References

External links 
 
 ReverbNation page

South Korean indie rock groups
All-female bands